Predrag Zimonjić (born 15 October 1970, in Belgrade) is a Serbian water polo player who played for FR Yugoslavia at two consecutive Summer Olympics, starting in 1996.

See also
 List of Olympic medalists in water polo (men)
 List of World Aquatics Championships medalists in water polo

External links
 
 Serbian Olympic Committee

References

1970 births
Living people
Yugoslav male water polo players
Serbia and Montenegro male water polo players
Serbian male water polo players
Water polo players at the 1996 Summer Olympics
Water polo players at the 2000 Summer Olympics
Olympic water polo players of Yugoslavia
Olympic bronze medalists for Federal Republic of Yugoslavia
Sportspeople from Belgrade
Olympic medalists in water polo
Medalists at the 2000 Summer Olympics